Anthousa or Anthoussa may refer to:

Places in Greece 
 Anthousa, Attica, a town in East Attica
 Anthousa, Kozani, a town in Tsotyli, Kozani
 Anthousa, Messenia, a settlement in Messenia
 Anthousa, Preveza, a village in Preveza, Epirus
 Anthousa, Trikala, a village in Aspropotamos, Trikala
 Anthousa Castle, a castle in Preveza

Names 
 Anthousa Roujoux, Greek daughter of Christos Palaskas (1788–1822)
 Anthousa, another name for the deity of fortune Tyche of Constantinople
 Anthousa, the monastic name of the wife of Nicholas Maliasenos in the 13th century
 Saint Anthousa the Younger (757–809), nun and last child of Eudokia, wife of Constantine V

See also
 Anthousa, Xanthousa, Chrisomalousa, a Greek folktale